GVK One is a shopping mall located in Banjara Hills, Hyderabad, India. The  mall was opened to public on 1 May 2009.

Stores 
The mall has 70 branded stores and its anchor store Shoppers Stop spans  in three levels. The mall has a six-screen INOX multiplex housed in it. The mall is established and promoted by GVK Power and Infrastructure limited. The mall also has KFC, Starbucks, Chai Point, and Hard Rock Cafe outlets.

References

Shopping malls in Hyderabad, India
Shopping malls established in 2009
2009 establishments in Andhra Pradesh